The Society for Vascular Medicine is a United States-based medical specialty professional society in the field of vascular medicine. Vascular medicine is a subspecialty of internal medicine or of Cardiology.

Work
The Society of Vascular Medicine promotes and advances the field of the Vascular Medicine to improve the care of its patients. Its membership is multidisciplinary, drawing from specialists in internal medicine, cardiology, vascular surgery, interventional radiology, hematology, and podiatry, among others.

Conferences
The Society for Vascular Medicine hosts two major conferences annually:
 The Vascular Scientific Sessions. This is an annual international medical conference held in the United States. It focuses on clinical vascular medicine as well as vascular-related medical research (including basic science, translational science, outcomes science and clinical trials).
 The Society for Vascular Medicine Fellows and Advanced practice nurse Course.

Visit the SVM website for additional education and training opportunities in vascular medicine.

Structure
The Society for Vascular Medicine is a volunteer, 501(c)(3) organization. It has an Executive Committee and a Board of Trustees. There are several committees. Each committee has a chair and a co-chair who serve for a period of 1-3 years. The society is managed by a management company, Veritas AMC.

References

External links

Medical associations based in the United States
Angiology
Medical and health organizations based in Illinois